State Route 290 (SR 290), named Hamilton Street and Trent Avenue, is an  long state highway serving Spokane County in the U.S. state of Washington. From Spokane Valley, the roadway continues to the Idaho state border, where it becomes .

The current route of SR 290 was formerly county roads between 1901 and 1937 when it became Secondary State Highway 2H (SSH 2H). A short spur route connecting the main highway to I-90 was also added during the renumbering, but SR 290 was realigned to replace the route in 2005.

Route description

This interchange was originally built for a planned North Spokane Corridor in the 1970s. The freeway continues north to an interchange with 2nd Avenue that only allows eastbound traffic to enter and westbound traffic to exit the freeway. The highway is named Hamilton Street and travels north over Sprague Avenue, BNSF Railway tracks, and the Spokane River before intersecting Trent Avenue, the former route of the roadway prior to 2005. At the intersection, located near Gonzaga University, SR 290 turns east and becomes Trent Avenue before crossing the Spokane River again. Trent Avenue travels northeast through an industrial district, paralleling the Spokane International branch of the Union Pacific Railroad, through Millwood before intersecting , locally named Pines Road. The highway crosses the Spokane River a third time and enters the Trentwood neighborhood of Spokane Valley, where it intersects Sullivan Road by way of a diamond interchange. From Spokane Valley, the roadway travels northeast through farmland to Newman Lake, where it crosses into Idaho and becomes , which continues east to Rathdrum as Trent Road.

SR 290 is maintained by the Washington State Department of Transportation (WSDOT), which conducts an annual survey on state highways to measure traffic volume in terms of average annual daily traffic. Average traffic volumes on the highway in 2016 ranged from a minimum of 7,000 vehicles at Havana Street in eastern Spokane to a maximum of 35,000 vehicles at the intersection of Hamilton Street and Trent Avenue. One of the main uses for SR 290 is to connect Interstate 90 to Spokane's University District, which includes the campuses of Gonzaga University, Washington State University, and Eastern Washington University.

History

A road following the Great Northern Railway and Northern Pacific Railway line from Spokane to the Idaho state border at Newman Lake has existed since 1901. SSH 2H was scheduled to be designated SR 290 in 1970 after a highway renumbering in 1964. The new designation was made to align with the sign route, now state route, system. In 1970, the state route system came into effect and SR 290 was formally established.

The state legislature established a spur route of SR 290 in 1977 to connect it with I-90, using a recently built interchange at Liberty Park that was intended for the cancelled north–south freeway project. The spur would require a new crossing of the Spokane River, named the James E. Keefe Bridge, and funding for its construction was delayed several times due to other needs in the state. The bridge's construction was plagued with issues, including a survey error that resulted in several misplaced piers, and an audit was conducted by the state after it was completed in November 1984. In 2005, the western terminus of SR 290 was moved southeast to an exit with I-90, replacing the spur route.

Until its closure in 2020, the highway crossed the Spokane River on the East Trent Bridge, which was constructed in 1910 by the Spokane city government. The concrete arch bridge was demolished and will be replaced by a new structure that is set to open in 2023.

Major intersections

Spur route

This spur route followed a portion of the cancelled North/South Freeway, which was intended to bypass Downtown Spokane and the Division Street corridor. The western terminus of SR 290 was realigned in 2005, ending at I-90 along the former route of SR 290 Spur.

Major intersections

References

External links

Highways of Washington State
WSDOT – S. Hamilton Street Traffic Camera

290
Transportation in Spokane County, Washington